Dami is a village and municipality in Nepal. It may also refer to
Dami (name)
Dami Aqa, a village in Iran
Dami Mission in South Korea
Jabal Umm ad Dami, the highest mountain in Jordan
"Dami Duro", a song by Nigerian recording artist Davido
Dami Im, eponymous album by Dami Im

See also
Dhami (disambiguation)